Fiebelman Nunatak is one of the Grossman Nunataks of Antarctica, lying  east-northeast of Cheeks Nunatak. It was mapped by the United States Geological Survey (USGS) from U.S. Navy aerial photographs taken 1965–68, and was named in 1987 by the Advisory Committee on Antarctic Names after Harold E. Fiebelman, a USGS cartographer, who worked in the field at Byrd Station and South Pole Station, 1972–73.

References 

Nunataks of Palmer Land